In 1969 the Israeli government under Golda Meir approved of a plan to pay 60,000 Palestinians to leave Gaza for Paraguay. At the time, Paraguay was ruled by the Alfredo Stroessner regime, which had agreed in 1967 to go along with the proposal, seeing Palestinians as ideal immigrants out of a need for labor as well as a notion that as mostly Muslims they were not inclined towards communism. At the time the agreement was made, Israel had just won the Six-Day War, conquering the Gaza strip with a substantial Palestinian population Israel wanted to get rid of, in addition to the Sinai peninsula, East Jerusalem, Golan Heights, and the West Bank. While estimates of the exact number of Palestinians sent to Paraguay due to the project vary, ranging from "a few dozen" to "thousands", it is widely agreed that the project was a failure, with the number that made the trip being only a small percent of the 60,000 Palestinians in Gaza the Israeli and Paraguayan governments intended to reach. Under the plan, Palestinians in Gaza were enticed to move to Paraguay by "travel agencies" set up in Gaza to promote emigration to Paraguay; those who moved to Paraguay would be given a one-time lump sum of $100, while the Paraguayan government would be paid $33 per Palestinian it accepted, and after five years of residency they were to become eligible for a path to citizenship. However, upon arrival, having been left in the country with few resources and with no guarantee of employment, they became destitute. Many of those that went had been lured in with false promises of becoming landowners and receiving further financial support, leading to additional frustration.

See also 
 Madagascar plan
 Mubarek zone
 Bhasan Char

References

History of the Gaza Strip
History of the Palestinian refugees
History of Paraguay
Settlement schemes in Paraguay
Israel–Paraguay relations
Golda Meir